HP Boyz are an Australian hip hop and drill band formed in 2019 in Hampton Park, Melbourne. The band is composed of "YJ" ,"HP Onit" and formerly “IKONIC” and "MWAYS". Their most listened to single on Spotify "Engineers" has accumulated more than 20 million streams.

Career

2019 
The band sold out 7 shows in New Zealand in less than 10 minutes

2020–present: 6 to the World
The band released their debut extended play 6 to the World on 8 May 2020

Musical style and influences
The group cites Australian hip hop artists Alex Jones and Son of Sam as inspirations for their music, and also UK rap artists such as Stormzy, Skepta, and Headie One just to name a few.

Personal lives
All members of the band currently reside in Hampton Park, Melbourne.

Band members
Current members
 HP YJ  (2019–present) 
 HP ONIT (2019–present)

Discography

Extended plays

Singles

Notes

Awards and nominations

APRA Awards
The APRA Awards are held in Australia and New Zealand by the Australasian Performing Right Association to recognise songwriting skills, sales and airplay performance by its members annually.

! 
|-
| 2022
| "Loyalty"
| Most Performed Hip Hop/Rap Work
| 
| 
|-

References

External links
 

Australian hip hop groups
Drill musicians
Musical groups established in 2019
2019 establishments in Australia